Neuroendocrine protein 7B2 is a protein that in humans is encoded by the SCG5 gene.  The protein expressed by this gene is widely distributed in neuroendocrine tissues. It functions as a chaperone protein for the proprotein convertase PC2 by blocking the aggregation of this protein, and is required for the production of an active PC2 enzyme. It is an intrinsically disordered protein that may also function as a chaperone for other aggregating secretory proteins in addition to proPC2 (Helwig et al. 2013). 7B2 has been identified in vertebrates and in invertebrates as low as flatworms (Protein ID: AIZ72728.1) and insects. It is also called Sgne1 and Secretogranin V.  In C. elegans, it was originally called e7B2 and then renamed Seven B Two (gene name sbt-1). There is a Pfam entry for this protein: Secretogranin_V (PF05281).

References

Further reading